"Geboren um zu leben" ("Born to Live") is the first single from Unheilig's album Grosse Freiheit and the sixth single of the band. As of December 2010, the single has been certified triple gold with 450,000 copies sold.

Meaning 

The song "Geboren um zu leben" was inspired by the death of a close friend of Unheilig's frontman, Der Graf. In 2008, the friend suffered a heart attack and stroke, from which he did not recover; Der Graf was with him when he died.

Track listing

Music video 

On January 14, 2010, the official music video for "Geboren um zu leben" was released.

Charts

Year-end charts

References 

2010 singles
2010 songs
Unheilig songs